Zinc finger protein 490 is a protein that in humans is encoded by the ZNF490 gene.

References

Further reading